Brave New World is the fourth album from Canadian Christian singer Amanda Cook and her first album not to be released under "Amanda Falk", her maiden name. The album was released through Bethel Music on September 25, 2015. Cook also studio recorded two songs from previous Bethel Music albums. Joel Taylor and Brian Johnson executively produced the album.

Critical reception

Matt Conner, rating the album four stars from CCM Magazine, describes, "The ethereal feel of Brave New World helps Bethel Music's Amanda Cook carve out an impressive and instant niche on her debut solo recording." Indicating in a four star review by Worship Leader, Gary Durbin says, "With this full-length album, you'll experience a very meditative and deep worship journey. I have had this on repeat, and it has been a beautiful soundtrack for personal worship." Joshua Andre, allotting the album four and a half stars by 365 Days of Inspiring Media, responds, "A brilliant album for a well-respected singer songwriter and worship leader!"

Awarding the album four and a half stars at New Release Today, Caitlin Lassiter states, "Amanda Cook has created a beautiful atmosphere of genuine worship and praise with Brave New World." Madeleine Dittmer, giving the album four and a half stars for The Christian Beat, writes, "Brave New World will have you worshiping along with the gracefully written songs from the first listen." Signaling in a four star review from Jesus Freak Hideout, Lucas Munachen responds, "For those looking for songs that are a little more personal than the flashy lights of the stage, taking a voyage to Amanda Cook's new world is definitely worth the while."

Awards and accolades
On August 11, 2016, the Gospel Music Association was announced that Brave New World would be nominated for a GMA Dove Award in the Inspirational Album of the Year category at the 47th Annual GMA Dove Awards.

On October 11, 2016, Brave New World won the GMA Dove Award for Inspirational Album of the Year with producers Jason Ingram, Paul Mabury and Amanda Cook being the recipients.

Singles
"Heroes" was released to Christian radio as the lead single from the album on September 4, 2015.

Track listing

Chart performance

References

2015 debut albums
Amanda Cook (singer) albums